Blastobasis orithyia is a moth in the  family Blastobasidae. It is found in Costa Rica.

The length of the forewings is 5–5.3 mm. The forewings are pale brown intermixed with brown scales tipped with pale brown and dark-brown scales. The hindwings are translucent pale brown.

Etymology
The specific epithet refers to Orithyia, daughter of Erechtheus, a king of Athens.

References

Moths described in 2013
Blastobasis